Ragnar Ingi Margeirsson (14 August 1962 – 10 February 2002) was an Icelandic professional footballer who played as a forward.

Club career
Ragnar started his career at Keflavík before moving abroad to play for several clubs in Belgium, Germany and Austria. He returned to Iceland to finish his career at the same side where he started.

International career
Ragnar made his debut for Iceland in an August 1981 friendly match against Nigeria and went on to collect 46 caps, scoring 5 goals. He played his last international match in an October 1992 World Cup qualifying match against Russia.

External links
 German stats at fussbalportal
 
 RAGNAR MARGEIRSSON - Morgunbladid

References

1962 births
2002 deaths
Ragnar Margeirsson
Ragnar Margeirsson
Ragnar Margeirsson
Association football forwards
FC 08 Homburg players
K.A.A. Gent players
Cercle Brugge K.S.V. players
K. Waterschei S.V. Thor Genk players
Ragnar Margeirsson
TSV 1860 Munich players
SK Sturm Graz players
Ragnar Margeirsson
Expatriate footballers in Germany
Ragnar Margeirsson
Belgian Pro League players
Expatriate footballers in Belgium
Ragnar Margeirsson
Expatriate footballers in Austria
Ragnar Margeirsson
Ragnar Margeirsson